N'guigmi is a department of the Diffa Region in Niger. Its capital lies at the city of N'guigmi. As of 2011, the department had a total population of 77,748 people.

References

Departments of Niger
Diffa Region